This is an incomplete list of Panasonic Projectors

Home Theater Projectors 
Front projection with a widescreen ratio for home use and budget.

References 

Panasonic
Projectors